The Strubben–Kniphorstbos is a nature reserve of 377 hectares, located between Anloo and Schipborg in the Dutch province of Drenthe. It is the only archaeological reserve in the Netherlands.

Beginning in 1938, the site was for the most part of the 20th century used as a military training ground.

Reserve 
In 2006 the area was placed under the administration of Staatsbosbeheer and designated as an archaeological national monument. The layout of the forest was then managed according to the landscape approach, taking into account the historical land use in different periods. As a nature reserve, the reserve partly falls under the Drentsche Aa area, a Natura 2000 area.

The province of Drenthe is rich in archaeological remains of the funnelbeaker culture, with 54 extant dolmens, of which two (D7 and D8) are within the boundaries of the reserve. It also houses some sixty burial mounds.

References

External links 

 Cultural historical inventory of the Strubben-Kniphorstbos on www.drentscheaa.nl

Nature reserves in the Netherlands
Forests of the Netherlands
Archaeological sites in the Netherlands
Geography of Drenthe
Aa en Hunze